Tappeto Volante ("Flying Carpet") is the third and final album by Italian world music pioneers Aktuala. It was released on Bla Bla records in 1976. It is the second recording of percussionist Trilok Gurtu

Profile
It is a mixture of live and studio recordings, mostly recorded in Morocco after a year spent traveling and playing there. The resulting recordings were then interspersed with studio recordings featuring electronic enhancements. This latter studio compositional style point to Walter Maioli's next project, Futuro Antico in which such mixtures dominated. There are shorter tracks than on the previous recordings but they have segues making a collage effect.

Musicians
The musicians are:
 Walter Maioli: Arabic oboe, wooden flute, naj, bass flute, maranzano, bass harmonica, sil-sil, seeds, desert flute, sea triton, zampogna, reeds, whistles, bells
 Daniele Cavallanti: soprano saxophone, dolak, derbuka
 Antonio Cerantola: acoustic guitar
 Kela Rangoni Macchiavelli: zanza, tamboura, maracas, seeds, rings
 Fabrizio Cassanoi: sitar
 Marjon Klok: harp, tamboura, bells, sil-sil, cymbals
 Trilok Gurtu: tabla, snake drums, Moroccan bongos, cymbals, xylophone, cow bells, sil-sil, wood block

Track listing
The tracks are:
 Churinga
 Ohnedaruth
 Ugula Baliue African Planet
 Il Ritmo Del Cammello (The Rhythm of the Camel)
 Hare
 Mr Trilok
 Chitarra E Piffero (Guitar and Pipes)
 Echo Raga
 Mediterraneo
 Flash
 Waruna
 Aksak
 Nettuno Dio Del Mare (Neptune God of the Sea)

References

External links 
 Page at soundohm
 Page at italianprog.com

1976 albums
Aktuala albums
Trilok Gurtu albums